Parliamentary elections were held in Haiti on 14 October 1930. The elections were authorized by the United States, which wished to pull out of Haiti after a lengthy occupation, and resulted in a majority for nationalist forces. The newly elected National Assembly elected Sténio Vincent as president on 18 November.

Following the elections, the last US Marines left Haiti in 1934.

References

Elections in Haiti
Haiti
1930 in Haiti
Election and referendum articles with incomplete results